NetPositive (often called Net+) is the default web browser for the discontinued Be Operating System (BeOS). It includes partial support for JavaScript, but no CSS support. It was originally developed as a stop-gap measure because no browsers had been ported to BeOS.

Error messages in Haiku

The browser's haiku error messages were noted among BeOS users, which led to the name of Haiku, an open-source operating system inspired by BeOS. A late 1990s email joke which claimed that Microsoft was moving to Haiku error messages in Japanese versions of Windows was almost entirely made up of NetPositive error messages. For instance, a user might see the following error message if they try to access a website that is unavailable:

Cables have been cut
Southwest of Northeast somewhere
We are not amused.

If the user tried unsuccessfully to authenticate against a website, they might see:

Server's poor response
Not quick enough for browser.
Timed out, plum blossom.

References

External links
NetPositive 2.2 PNG screenshots
Themis home page
List of NetPositive haiku error messages

BeOS software
Discontinued web browsers